Eriskay, from the Old Norse for "Eric's Isle", is an island and community council area of the Outer Hebrides in northern Scotland with a population of 143, as of the 2011 census. It lies between South Uist and Barra and is connected to South Uist by a causeway which was opened in 2001. In the same year Ceann a' Ghàraidh in Eriskay became the ferry terminal for travelling between South Uist and Barra. The Caledonian MacBrayne vehicular ferry travels between Eriskay and Ardmore in Barra. The crossing takes around 40 minutes.

Geography

Although only a small island (about ) Eriskay has many claims to fame that have made the island well-known far beyond the Hebrides. It is associated with the traditional Hebridean song, the Eriskay Love Lilt; with the Eriskay Pony and the Eriskay jersey (made without any seams). 

There is a well-stocked shop in Eriskay, a community centre and the Politician Lounge Bar (named after the famous ship which ran aground. The accident unintentionally provided the whole island with a generous supply of free whisky and inspiring the Compton Mackenzie novel Whisky Galore!.

History
On 2 August 1745 the privateer Du Teillay landed Prince Charles Edward Stuart and the Seven Men of Moidart on Eriskay to start the Jacobite rising of 1745. The site where the Prince first set foot upon Scottish soil is now called Coilleag a' Phrionnsa.

For decades after Catholic Emancipation in 1829, there was still no resident Roman Catholic priest in Eriskay and the island's population was largely served by priests ferried by local fishermen across the Sound of Barra from St Peter's Roman Catholic Church at Daliburgh, South Uist.

Since it was consecrated by Bishop George Smith in 1903, St Michael's Roman Catholic Church has sat atop Cnoc nan Sgrath, a hill overlooking the main village on Eriskay. It was famously built with stones and homemade mortar by the local population under the leadership of the Bard Father Allan MacDonald. The site of the previous thatched chapel is marked by a memorial garden and a statue of the Virgin Mary, overlooking the Sound of Barra.

Due to the long residence of Fr. Allan MacDonald, Eriskay is also important to Scottish Gaelic literature. In his iconic song poem Eilein na h-Òige ("Island of the Young"), Fr. MacDonald praises the beauty of Eriskay, its wildlife, and the fondness of its people for telling tales from the Fenian Cycle of Celtic mythology inside the ceilidh house. He also commented upon the visits to Eriskay by Saint Columba, Iain Muideartach, Chief of Clanranald, and Prince Charles Edward Stuart. Fr. MacDonald also denounced the Highland Clearances upon the island, but expressed joy that the crofters had been granted greater rights against the landlords.

Community buy-out
After a protracted campaign local residents took control of the island on 30 November 2006 in a community buy-out. The previous landowners, a sporting syndicate, sold the assets of the  estate including Benbecula, South Uist and Eriskay for £4.5 million to a community-owned organisation known as Stòras Uibhist which was set up to purchase the land and to manage it in perpetuity.

Transport

Eriskay is traversed by a number of mountain paths and tracks, and has just a single motor road. The first stretch of that road was built in 1935, funded through proceeds from the first showing in London of the Werner Kissling film.

There is a regular bus service on the island which forms part of the "Spine Route" between Eriskay Slipway and Berneray via South Uist, Benbecula and North Uist. Services are provided by DA Travel with funding from Comhairle nan Eilean Siar.

In 2009 the previous primitive quay facilities at the excellent natural harbour of Acarsaid Mhòr were extended and modernised, with improved vehicular access. Some smaller fishing boats continue—at least if the tides and weather are favourable—to use the shelving bay at Haun (from the Viking for 'harbour'—but scarcely with sufficient shelter to constitute a harbour in practice). Acarsaid Mhòr is also used by visiting yachts.

Crofting

Following the establishment of the first Crofting Commission in the 1880s, the whole of the island, together with the small adjoining Stack Island, were incorporated into the crofting townships—as below—of
Acarsaid Mhòr – 14 crofts, 10 shares
Am Baile (Balla) – 16 crofts, 15 shares
Bun a' Mhuillinn – 10 crofts, 10 shares
Coilleag – 10 crofts, 10 shares
Na Hann (Haun) – 6 crofts, 4 shares
Na Pàirceannan (Parks) – 4 crofts, 4 shares
Roisinis (Roshinish) – 4 crofts, 6 shares
Rudha Bàn – 9 crofts, 5 shares
Total – 73 crofts, 64 shares

The souming (a word originating in the Viking era) for each full share gives the right to put, on the common grazings (the high ground of Beinn Sgrithean and Beinn Stac), ten sheep, two cows and one Eriskay Pony (all plus their 'followers'—young up to one year old). Most crofts have one full share, but many have a half share, and a few have two shares, and one croft has as many as 3 shares.

The crofts are small (typically five hectares or less) and the land is rocky and exposed to harsh weather. These days, very few crofts are actively worked: there is little economic return in relation to the effort, and although there is a strong cultural attachment to the land, the demands and distractions of modern life leave little time for tending livestock and manual work. Much of the best grazing land, the machair of the north west of the island, has been compromised by house-building and the increasing opposition to the free-range grazing of cattle and sheep during the winter. Now, the most actively worked crofts are in the township of Bun a' Mhuillin.

The island's common grazings, and the grazing of croft inbye land during the winter months, are regulated by the Eriskay Grazings Committee, the members of which serve a three-year term, supported by a Grazings Clerk, and according to the Grazings Regulations as provided for in the Crofting Acts.

Emigration

Many Eriskay families have had to leave the island in recent years in search of work and some historic island families have few or no descendants left on the island. An example of these families is the MacInnes who were a prominent island family at the time of the Kissling film but now number just four members of the extended family dwelling on the island, and active in crofting, shell-fishing, building work, as well contributing to the community.

Many of those who leave for the mainland are young as—in common with remoter rural areas generally—there are few work opportunities and limited access to further or higher education.

The island's population was 143, as recorded by the 2011 census—an increase of 7.5% since 2001, when there were 133 usual residents. During the same period Scottish island populations as a whole grew by 4% to 103,702.

Tourism
 there were no hotels, two or three bed-and-breakfast establishments, and until recently few self-catering cottages or houses. Since the completion in 2001 of the causeway to South Uist and the inauguration of the vehicle ferry to Barra, a number of properties have been professionally renovated or purpose-built as holiday accommodation. The machair and beaches from Coilleag a' Phrionnsa to Rudha Bàn are increasingly popular with visitors travelling with their motor-homes.

The island is home to a herd of Eriskay Ponies owned and maintained by members of Comann Each nan Eilean – The Eriskay Pony Society, founded in 1972. The ponies are bound by crofting regulations and are brought to the hill grazings in spring, and back down into the township for the winter. They graze and roam around the island to whichever part is most comfortable depending on the climate. Although the ponies have a laid-back temperament and are accustomed to humans, they should be approached with care and visitors should refrain from feeding them, as this can be harmful to the animals.

Wildlife
Sea bindweed, which is not native to the Hebrides, grows on the island. Its presence there is said to stem from the arrival of the "Bonnie Prince", who accidentally dropped the seeds when he pulled a handkerchief from his pocket.

In popular culture
Allan MacDonald (1859–1905), a Roman Catholic priest, important figure in Scottish Gaelic literature, and activist for crofters' rights, died and was buried on Eriskay.
Prince Charles and Princess Diana visited the island during their tour of the Western Isles in July 1985.
Father Calum (Malcolm Joseph) MacLellan (1926–2012) priest, appearing in series 5 and 6 of An Island Parish, first vice-convener of Comhairle nan Eilean Siar.
 An important early documentary film, Eriskay: A Poem of Remote Lives, made in 1934 by German filmmaker Werner Kissling was made and set on the island.

See also 

List of islands of Scotland

References

Further reading

 Amy Murray (1920), Father Allan's Island, Harcourt, Brace and Howe, Inc.

External links

Am Paipear Community Newspaper*"Eriskay, 1934" Video (Werner Kissling)
Legislation relating to construction of causeway
National Library of Scotland: SCOTTISH SCREEN ARCHIVE (selection of archive films about Eriskay)]
Uist & Eriskay Community News and Information Resource
Scotsman photos of royal visit to Eriskay in 1985

Uist islands
Islands of the Sound of Barra
Community buyouts in Scotland
Highland Estates